Interstate 115 (I-115) is a  auxiliary Interstate Highway which connects I-15/I-90 to Butte in the U.S. state of Montana. The highway is concurrent with I-15 Bus./I-90 Bus. for its entire length. The highway travels from an incomplete interchange with I-15/I-90 through generally rural areas in western Butte. It also has an interchange with Excelsior Avenue before terminating. The entire route was improved to Interstate standards during the 1960s, and was further improved in 2005.

Route description
I-115 begins at an interchange with I-15/I-90. As a four-lane highway with two lanes in each direction, I-115 heads east into downtown Butte. Before reaching exit 1, eastbound traffic makes a curve while westbound traffic goes to I-15/I-90 without making such a curve, therefore, that portion of I-115 contains a large median. Approximately  from I-15/I-90, I-115 has its only interchange at Excelsior Avenue, which can be used to access the town of Walkerville. Excelsior Avenue is the only numbered exit along I-115, and the structure of the interchange directs motorists to stop and yield signs, as opposed to traffic signals for most exits in urban areas. I-115 ends at the overpass over Excelsior Avenue. It continues into Butte as I-15 Bus./I-90 Bus.

History

The development of a freeway along the modern-day I-115 corridor was proposed in the 1950s. The 1955 General Location of National System of Interstate Highways, an early platform for what would become the Interstate Highway System,  contained an inset of the proposed freeways in and around the city of Butte including an east–west freeway spur on the west side of the community. Designated as part of the Interstate Highway System around 1957, I-115's construction was funded by the federal government.

Exit list

References

Footnotes

References

External links

 Interstate 115 - Montana

Auxiliary Interstate Highways
Interstate Highways in Montana
Interstate 15
Transportation in Silver Bow County, Montana
Butte, Montana